Federico Russo (born October 19, 1997) is an Italian actor.

Career 
He debuted in 2004, appearing in the television series Incantesimo 7, broadcast in Italy by Rai 2. In 2005, he appeared in Incantesimo 8 and television miniseries,  De Gasperi, l'uomo della speranza, broadcast by Rai Uno. In the same year, he won Dancing with the Children Starlets, category of the second edition of Dancing with the Stars, the Rai Uno conducted by Milly Carlucci.

In 2006, he appeared in the miniseries Canale 5, Carabinieri – Sotto copertura, spin-off of series Carabinieri.

From 2006 - 2014 he grew popular for his role as Mimmo Cesaroni, in Canale 5's I Cesaroni, with Claudio Amendola and Elena Sofia Ricci.

From June 6 to 9, 2009, he participated, as a guest, on Post Break, broadcast on Rai Gulp, along with Angelica Cinquantini; also from the cast of I Cesaroni. In the same year, he participated in the TV series The Teacher, in the role of Nino.

In 2010, he starred in the music video for the song Anime di Vetro, by PQuadro. In 2011, he starred in another music video, this time for Max Pezzali's Credi.

In 2015, he started playing Sam in the Italian Disney Channel sitcom Alex & Co..

In January 2016, the Alex & Co. album We Are One was released. The album has 10 songs, including 6 of which he sings in; in April he performed at an Alex & Co. fan event. 
In the same year, as part of the Alex & Co. franchise, he starred in the film Alex & Co: How to Grow Up Despite Your Parents.

In 2017, he appeared in the Rai series Scomparsa, as Luca Rebeggiani, working with Vanessa Incontrada, Eleonora Gaggero, and Saul Nanni. He also participated in the series L'Isola di Pietro as Matteo Sulci, broadcast on Canale 5. 

In 2018, he played Seba in the eleventh season of Don Matteo, broadcast on Rai 1. 

In 2019, he stars in the film La Mia Seconda Volta (My Second Time).

In 2020, he plays Mauro, one of the leads, in the Netflix series Curon.

Private life 
He currently lives in Rome with his parents and his five siblings (two brothers and three sisters).

Filmography

Other experience 
 Testimonial the advertising campaign of Never Without You with Francesco Totti (2008–2009)
 Testimonial of WPM (2009–2012)
 Anime di vetro, directed by Gabriele Paoli – Videoclip of PQuadro (2010)
 Credi – Music video of Max Pezzali (2011)

References

External links 
 

1997 births
Living people
Male actors from Rome
Italian male film actors
Italian male television actors
Italian male child actors
21st-century Italian male actors
Reality show winners